Arlene Reid Wohlgemuth (born July 16, 1947) is a former  Republican member of the Texas House of Representatives from District 58 in Johnson and Bosque counties south of Fort Worth, Texas.

Wohlgemuth served in the Seventy-fourth through Seventy-eighth Texas Legislatures. In 1997, she became involved in what was called the "Memorial Day Massacre."   She raised a point of order that killed fifty-two proposed bills by preventing them from coming up for a vote before the end of the legislative session. Wohlgemuth was angry that opposition legislators had used a similar procedure the week before to prevent a vote on a proposal supported by Wohlgemuth to require parental notification if a minor procures an abortion.

References

External links
 Texas House of Representatives biography
 

1947 births
Living people
People from Midland, Texas
People from Burleson, Texas
People from Austin, Texas
Republican Party members of the Texas House of Representatives
Women state legislators in Texas
Texas Tech University alumni
American Protestants
Activists from Texas
21st-century American politicians
21st-century American women politicians